The U.S. Summit Company, LP is an American multinational corporation that operates in the advisory space of industrial chemicals and consumer goods companies through throughout Asia. The firm was founded in 1948 by four university classmates and is currently headquartered in Pound Ridge, New York. The current President is Kenneth Wang. He is the son of the company's co-founder, Cheng Ching Wang, and the brother of fashion designer Vera Wang. He is also the developer and owner of the Pound Ridge Golf Club and is a member of the Massachusetts Institute of Technology Board of Trustees, the MIT Corporation.

History 
In 1947, PM Yen, JT Shaw, Cheng Ching Wang and later C.D. Shiah founded Summit Industrial Corporation. In 1948, the U.S. Summit Corporation was founded, the prior iteration of the current firm. The four founders were classmates at the Massachusetts Institute of Technology, choosing to name their company "Summit," representing the sum of MIT classmates.

The company formerly operated an oil refinery in Bangchak, Thailand and gas stations throughout the country. In 1965, Summit expanded its lease of the Bangchak refinery to produce 20,000 barrels of oil per day. In 1981, at the end of the contract, the Thai government took control of the operations back under the Ministry of Defense. During this time, Summit was responsible for approximately 6% of the liquefied petroleum gas market in Thailand.

Over its history, the company has been involved in the crude oil, pharmaceutical, computer, packaged food, and electronics industries covering partnerships with Motorola, General Motors, British Petroleum, and Caltex. At one time, Summit operated out of offices in Taiwan, Hong Kong, Bangkok, Kuala Lumpur, Okinawa, Singapore, Hanoi, Tokyo, and Bermuda. In addition, beginning in 1990, Cheng Ching Wang served as the sole funding source and Chairman of the Vera Wang Company.

Today, the company continues to consult with and advise companies seeking to expand operations primarily in Southeast Asia.

Pureen 
Summit currently provides consulting and management services in Southeast Asia under multiple businesses including the Pureen brand of maternity and baby products. Per a Euromonitor International Report, Pureen had a 41.9% market share of the baby tissue market in Malaysia in 2018.

References

External links
 Official site

Chemical companies of the United States
American companies established in 1947
Chemical companies established in 1947
Companies based in New York (state)